The men's 100 metres at the 2018 Commonwealth Games, as part of the athletics programme, took place in the Carrara Stadium on 8 and 9 April 2018. Akani Simbine of South Africa won the gold medal, running a time of 10.03 seconds in the final.

Akani Simbine won his first international 100 m title, delivering an upset over Yohan Blake – the second fastest man on the all-time lists who stumbled in the final after leading the semi-finals on time. Henricho Bruintjies, Simbine's compatriot who had entered the final as the slowest of the qualifiers, split the men to win silver. Adam Gemili, the 2014 silver medallist and third fastest in the semifinals, withdrew from the final due to injury.

Records
Prior to this competition, the existing world and Games records were as follows:

Schedule
The schedule was as follows:

All times are Australian Eastern Standard Time (UTC+10)

Results

First round
The first round consisted of nine heats. The two fastest competitors per heat (plus six fastest losers) advanced to the semifinals.

Heat 1

Heat 2

Heat 3

Heat 4

Heat 5

Heat 6

Heat 7

Heat 8

Heat 9

Semifinals
Three semi-finals were held. The two fastest competitors per semi (plus two fastest losers) advanced to the final.

Semifinal 1

Semifinal 2

Semifinal 3

Final
The medals were determined in the final.

References

Men's 100 metres
2018